Paola Barrientos (born February 23, 1975 in San Fernando, Buenos Aires, Argentina) is an Argentine actress. She worked in theater for several years. She took part in a successful TV spot of Banco Galicia, which allowed her to work in the 2012 telenovela Graduados.

Biography
Paola Barrientos began her acting studies after her graduation from high school. She was initially rejected by the Escuela Metropolitana de Arte Dramático and accepted at a later test.

Career
She began to work in several underground theaters, in plays such as 3-ex, Teo con Julia  and Exhibición y desfile, attended by very few people. Elijo la libertad has scripts by Conrado Geiger, Paola's husband. The play Estado de ira allowed her to be hired for several other productions. She became famous taking part in an advertisement for the Galicia bank, a parody of the Titanic film. She played the famous scene at the stern of the ship, making sharky remarks to a husband who failed to be romantic. The advertisement was co-starred by the actor Gonzalo Suárez, and was followed by similar ones. The actress Marilú Marini saw her at the Estado de Ira play and proposed her to work together at Complejo Teatral. The play Las criadas, starred by Barrientos and Marini, is a huge success, with tickets solds for weeks in advance. Estado de ira allowed her as well to be included in the cast of Graduados. Actress Andrea Pietra saw the play and advised her friend Nancy Dupláa, lead actress of the telenovela, to hire her for the role of the best friend of Dupláa's character, Victoria Lauría. Although Paola Barrientos made her first major work in television at the age of 38, Nancy Dupláa praised her professionalism and her adaption to the medium. As a result of the success of her character, Paola Barrientos was included in the front page of several Argentine magazines in 2012. She ended working in the Galicia advertisements in 2018, after 9 years. It was rumored that she was replaced because of her political ideas, close to Kirchnerism, but she clarified that she resigned simply because she considered that she had worked enough in those ads.

Filmography

Television

Movies

Theater

Awards and Nomination

References

External links
 
 Alternativa Teatral

Argentine actresses
Living people
1975 births